Kister or Kisters is a surname. Notable people with this surname include:
Gerry H. Kisters (1919–1986), American soldier
Kenneth Kister (born 1935), American library scientist
Jack Kister, American electrical engineer, developer of VMEbus
Jane Kister (1944–2019), British-American mathematician
Meir Jacob Kister (1914–2010), Jewish Arabist from Poland
Tim Kister (born 1986), German footballer